Irene Vélez Torres (born August 2, 1982) is a philosopher and doctor in political geography. Since August 11, 2022, she has held the position of Minister of Mines and Energy in Colombia.

Early life 
Irene Vélez is the daughter of Hildebrando Vélez, an environmentalist and educator recognized for his activism in the Black Communities Process through which he became very close to Francia Márquez.
Vélez Torres studied philosophy at the National University of Colombia, and a master's degree in cultural studies at the same university. She completed a doctorate in political geography at the University of Copenhagen in Denmark.

Vélez has served as an environmental social leader against mining in Colombia, leading research related to the environmental impact of illegal mining on communities and energy transition models, and serving as a professor at the Faculty of Engineering of the Universidad del Valle.

Minister of Mines and Energy 
In 2022, her name was suggested to be Minister of Science and Technology in the government of Gustavo Petro, since she had been appointed as part of the joint team in that area with the previous government. On August 6, 2022, President-elect Gustavo Petro appointed her Minister of Mines and Energy.

His appointment caused surprise due to the environmental activism that characterizes Vélez and that was not used to be a characteristic of those designated in this portfolio who have been administrators close to the extractivist energy sectors such as oil and coal extractors, although it was known that the campaign of the Petro government proposed an acceleration in the energy transition processes seeking to make the country less and less dependent on non-renewable extractive energies and increase technologies around clean or non-extractive energies.

References

External links 

|-

1982 births
Living people
People from Bogotá
Cabinet of Gustavo Petro
Government ministers of Colombia
Women government ministers of Colombia
21st-century Colombian politicians
21st-century Colombian women politicians
Ministers of Mines and Energy of Colombia
Fulbright alumni